Dan Steingart is an American materials science engineer, mechanical engineer, and co-founder of Wireless Industrial Technologies. He is currently an associate professor of mechanical and aerospace engineering at Princeton University and the Andlinger Center for Energy and Environment.

Princeton University faculty
Brown University School of Engineering alumni
UC Berkeley College of Engineering alumni
Year of birth missing (living people)
Living people